A Marman clamp is a type of heavy-duty band clamp; it allows two cylindrical objects to be clamped together end-to-end with a ring clamp. It is sometimes also known as a "Marman ring".  It consists of a circular strap with an interior V-shaped groove.  Tension is applied to the strap with a threaded bolt and nuts connecting to the ends of the strap.  As the tension increases, the V-groove wedges over flanges on the circular parts to be assembled, providing the force that holds the ends of the two cylinders together. The Marman clamp is an alternative to a bolted flange connection which  would be heavier and require more labor to connect. Another variety uses a flat strap, used where systems carry low pressure or to hold a cylindrical object in position.

Hose connectors 

A common use for Marman clamps is as quick-disconnect connectors in flexible aircraft fuel lines.

Spacecraft separation 
Marman clamps are used extensively in spaceflight systems and are common mechanical load-transfer and clamping mechanisms for connecting the upper stage and the satellite payload of space vehicles, for example, on the Cassini Plasma Spectrometer on the Cassini orbiter. They may also be used to join stages of a booster rocket.

Early separation systems using Marman clamps used explosive bolts for release. These have problems of unpredictability, the need to contain debris and difficulties in testing them. A more recent approach uses a screw thread. The tension of the clamp band itself is used to power the unscrewing of a central bolt, when released by a NASA Standard Initiator (NSI), a pyrotechnic pin puller.

History 
The Marman clamp was first produced by Herbert Marx, better known by his stage name Zeppo Marx; it was manufactured by his company, Marman Products from the 1930s.

At the time it was designed to secure cargo during transport. The U.S. Military used Marman clamps to transport the atomic bombs used at the end of the Second World War.

Marman clamps are found in many modern moving vehicles, though the screw band type clamp is becoming more popular.

See also
 Hose clamp
 Jubilee Clip

References

External links 
 The CAPS Launch Latch

Clamps (tool)
Plumbing
Spaceflight technology